Crank is a surname. Notable people with the surname include:

 Anthony Crank, British television presenter
 John Crank (1916–2006), British mathematical physicist
 Marion Crank (1915-1994), Arkansas politician
 Patrick Crank, American lawyer

See also

Krank (disambiguation)
Cronk (surname)
Crook (surname)